Signy Aarna (born 4 October 1990) is an Estonian footballer who plays as a forward for Finnish club Åland United and for the Estonia national team. She previously played for Finnish club Pallokissat and FC Lootos of the Estonian Naiste Meistriliiga.

Club career
From Ahja, Põlva County, Aarna started training with the youth team of FC Lootos as a goalkeeper in 2003. In 2005, 2007 and 2008 she won Estonian youth titles with the club's different age groups.

FC Lootos
In 2008, she started in FC Lootos' senior squad in the Esiliiga, the second level of women's football in Estonia. FC Lootos won the league and Aarna was the top scorer with 48 goals. From 2009 she played for FC Lootos in the top level Naiste Meistriliiga. She remains the club's most capped player with 121 games in all competitions and 166 goals in Estonian league and cup games.

Pallokissat
Despite offers from other Meistriliiga clubs, Aarna opted to stay with her hometown club until leaving the country. After the end of season 2013, Aarna signed her first professional contract with Naisten Liiga club Pallokissat in Finland. In her debut season Aarna scored 13 goals in 21 matches, she became the club's top scorer and helped the team to reach third place and the first ever medals in the club's history. 2015 proved to be another productive season for Aarna, as she scored 17 goals in Naisten Liiga and she became again the club's top scorer.

Åland United
Before the 2018 season, Aarna joined Åland United.

International career
Aarna debuted for the senior national team in the 2009 Baltic Cup, starting her first game on 29 April 2009 against Latvia and scoring Estonia's fifth and final goal on her home ground, Lootospark. She previously played at Under-17 and under-19 levels. On 26 November 2021, she played her 100th match for Estonia during the 2023 FIFA Women's World Cup qualification.

Career statistics
Scores and results list Estonia's Women's National team first

Goals scored in official competitions

Complete list of games

Source:

Club

Personal life
Aarna attended Ahja Keskkool. In 2009, she moved to University of Tartu to study sports development with coaching.

Awards
In 2010 Aarna was awarded Female Meistriliiga Footballer of the Season.
In 2011 and 2015 Female Footballer of the Year.

References

External links

Players profile at UEFA.com

1990 births
Living people
People from Põlva Parish
Estonian women's footballers
Estonia women's international footballers
Expatriate women's footballers in Finland
Kansallinen Liiga players
Pallokissat players
Estonian expatriate footballers
Estonian expatriate sportspeople in Finland
Women's association football forwards
FIFA Century Club